Anthony Peacocke was a United Kingdom police officer. He was Inspector-General of the Royal Ulster Constabulary during 1969.

Early life and education

Peacocke was born in Bangor, County Down, in 1909.  He was awarded a degree in natural sciences from the University of Cambridge, and joined the RUC in 1932.

Police career
During his career, prior to his appointment as Inspector-general, he served in Ballymoney, Belfast and Enniskillen.  He was Deputy Inspector-General in 1963. He was appointed as Inspector-General on 5 February 1969.

Inspector-General
During the increasingly violent period in Northern Ireland in 1969, Peacocke initially resisted the deployment of the British Army although changed his view, after a telephone call from Graham Shillington, the Deputy Inspector-General, early in the morning of 13 August.
The extent of disorder in Northern Ireland at that time prompted the commissioning of the Hunt Report, which was published in October 1969. A few days earlier, Peacocke had been asked to resign, and his resignation, although tendered immediately, was not announced until 10 October.

References

Further reading
 Ryder, Chris The RUC: A Force Under Fire (1989) Meuthen 
 Doherty, Richard The Thin Green Line: The History of the Royal Ulster Constabulary GC Pen & Sword Books 

Inspectors-General of the Royal Ulster Constabulary
Year of death missing
1909 births